David Pollet (born 12 August 1988) is a Belgian professional footballer who plays as a forward for French club Avranches. He also holds French citizenship.

Career
In 2008, Pollet played on loan at Stade de Reims from RC Lens.

On 15 January 2013, it was announced by his club Lens that Pollet has signed for Belgian club Charleroi on a free transfer with a further 30% of any future transfer fee going to Lens. He signed a 2.5-year contract and was handed the number 10 shirt, previously worn by the departing Hervé Kage.

On 12 August 2019, he signed with French club GFC Ajaccio.

Career statistics

Club

Honours
Lens
Coupe de la Ligue: runner-up 2008

Anderlecht
Belgian Pro League: 2014

Gent
Belgian Pro League: 2015

References

External links

 Career summary by playerhistory.com
 
 

1988 births
Living people
Association football forwards
Belgian footballers
Belgium under-21 international footballers
Belgium youth international footballers
French footballers
French people of Belgian descent
RC Lens players
Stade de Reims players
FC Gueugnon players
Paris FC players
R. Charleroi S.C. players
R.S.C. Anderlecht players
K.A.S. Eupen players
Gazélec Ajaccio players
US Avranches players
Ligue 1 players
Ligue 2 players
Championnat National players
Championnat National 2 players
Belgian Pro League players
Sportspeople from Nord (French department)
Belgian people of French descent
Footballers from Hauts-de-France